= Stückemarkt des Berliner Theatertreffens =

Theatre festival in Berlin, Germany

Stückemarkt des Berliner Theatertreffens is a theatre festival in Berlin, Germany.
